Manaskov is a surname. Notable people with the surname include:

Dejan Manaskov (born 1992), Macedonian handball player
Martin Manaskov (born 1994), Macedonian handball player
Pepi Manaskov (born 1964), Macedonian handball player and coach

Macedonian-language surnames